Elections to Liverpool City Council were held on 4 May 2006.  One third of the council was up for election and the Liberal Democrat party kept overall control of the council.  Overall turnout was 25%.

After the election, the composition of the council was

Election result

Ward results

Allerton and Hunts Cross

Anfield

Belle Vale

Central

Childwall

Church

Clubmoor

County

Cressington

Croxteth

Everton

Fazakerley

Greenbank

Kensington and Fairfield

Kirkdale

Knotty Ash

Mossley Hill

Norris Green

Old Swan

Picton

Princes Park

Riverside

St Michaels

Speke-Garston

Tuebrook and Stoneycroft

Warbreck

Wavertree

West Derby

Woolton

Yew Tree

By Elections

Speke-Garston 8 March 2007

References

External links
Results on council site

2006
2006 English local elections
2000s in Liverpool